Roman Pets (born 21 June 1969) is a retired Ukrainian footballer. He played for Metalist Kharkiv in Ukraine and Maccabi Haifa in Israel.

Professional career
Pets began playing football at the age of 9 at a sports boarding school in the city of Kharkiv. At first his coaches assigned him the role of forward, but after failing to do so he switched to play as a central defender. In 1990 he moved to the Metalist Kharkiv, playing in the Soviet Top League and then the Ukrainian Premier League. In 1993, Pets came to Israel and signed with Maccabi Haifa FC. Pets is best remembered for his 25-yard goal against Torpedo Moscow in the Holders' Cup.

He has played a major role during the 1993–94 season helping Maccabi Haifa FC go on and win the Israeli Premier League championship without losing a single game. 
Towards the end of the season, during a game against Maccabi Tel Aviv, he was controversially fouled by Meir Malika and broke his ankle, After a long absence, he returned to play but did not reach his pre-injury level.
In the 1995/1996 season, he was loaned to Hapoel Tsafririm Holon, until 1997 until he finally left Israel.

In 1997, he returned to Ukraine, first to Chernomorets Odessa and then to Metalist Kharkiv where he ended his career as a player in 2004.

Honours

As player
Maccabi Haifa FC
Israeli Premier League: 1993–94
Israeli Cup: 1994–95

Notes 

1969 births
Living people
Soviet footballers
Ukrainian footballers
Ukrainian expatriate footballers
FC Metalist Kharkiv players
FC Chornomorets Odesa players
Ukrainian Premier League players
Maccabi Haifa F.C. players
Hapoel Tzafririm Holon F.C. players
Expatriate footballers in Israel
Ukrainian expatriate sportspeople in Israel
Association football midfielders
Footballers from Kharkiv